Ralph Risk CBE, MC and Bar (28 July 1891 – 24 May 1961) was a Scottish solicitor, lawyer and president of the Law Society of Scotland. He also briefly played as an outside forward in the Scottish League for Queen's Park and was later the president of the club between 1935 and 1938.

Personal life 
Risk was educated at Queen's Park School and Mount Florida School in Glasgow and later studied law at Glasgow University, eventually becoming a solicitor. He was married with three sons and two daughters and his elder brother Charles also played football for Queen's Park. Risk was a member of the General Council of Solicitors in Scotland between 1933 and 1939, a senior partner in Maclay Murray & Spens and president of the Law Society of Scotland. He died in hospital in Edinburgh in 1961.

War service 
In June 1915, nearly a year after Britain's entry into the First World War, Risk received his commission as a second lieutenant in the Gordon Highlanders. He won an MC and Bar, for "conspicuous gallantry and devotion to duty" in actions at Rœux Chemical Works during the Battle of Arras in spring 1917 and during the Battle of the Scarpe in August 1918. Risk rose to the rank of captain during the course of his war service, having been promoted to lieutenant in July 1917 and to captain in April 1918. He left his battalion on special leave to Britain on 25 September 1918 and would see no further action before the Armistice.

Risk served with the Royal Air Force during the Second World War and established the barrage balloon defence of Scapa Flow in 1939. He later rose to the rank of wing commander and was superintendent of balloon development at RAF Cardington.

Career statistics

Notes

References

1891 births
Scottish footballers
Scottish Football League players
British Army personnel of World War I
Gordon Highlanders officers
Footballers from Glasgow
Association football outside forwards
Queen's Park F.C. players
Recipients of the Military Cross
1961 deaths
Alumni of the University of Glasgow
Royal Air Force personnel of World War II
Royal Air Force officers
Scottish solicitors
Scottish lawyers
Commanders of the Order of the British Empire
People educated at Queen's Park Secondary School